The 1999–2000 Kentucky Wildcats men's basketball team represented University of Kentucky in the 1999–2000 NCAA Division I men's basketball season. The head coach was Tubby Smith and the team finished the season with an overall record of 23–10.

References 

Kentucky Wildcats men's basketball seasons
Kentucky
Kentucky
Wild
Wild